Nickerson is a surname. Notable people with this surname include:

Business
Albert Nickerson (1911–1994), American executive with Mobil Oil, grandson of Albert W. Nickerson
Albert W. Nickerson (1840–1893), American railroad executive, nephew of Thomas and grandfather of Albert
Thomas Nickerson (ATSF) (1810–1892), American railroad executive, uncle of Albert W. Nickerson
William Nickerson Jr. (1879–1945), Los Angeles-based businessman and founder of Golden State Mutual Life Insurance Company
William Emery Nickerson (1853–1930), American inventor and vice-president of The Gillette Company

Law and politics
Bruce William Nickerson (1941–2022), American civil rights and gay rights attorney
Dave Nickerson (born 1944), Canadian politician from Northwest Territories
Eugene Nickerson (1918–2002), Democratic county executive of Nassau County, New York, and a federal district court judge
William M. Nickerson (born 1933), American judge in Maryland

Merchants
Ernest Reginald Nickerson (1876–1956), Canadian merchant and political figure in Nova Scotia
Maurice Nickerson (1865–1936), Canadian general merchant and political figure in Nova Scotia; son of Moses H. Nickerson
Smith Nickerson (1860–1954), Canadian merchant and political figure in Nova Scotia

Military
Franklin S. Nickerson (1826–1917), Union general during the American Civil War
Henry Nehemiah Nickerson (1888–1979), American Medal of Honor recipient
Herman Nickerson Jr. (1913–2000), United States Marine Corps general
John C. Nickerson Jr. (1915–1964), United States Army colonel charged under the Espionage Act
William Henry Snyder Nickerson (1875–1954), Canadian recipient of the Victoria Cross

Sports
Gaylon Nickerson (born 1969), American basketball player
Hardy Nickerson (born 1965), American football player and coach
Hardy Nickerson Jr. (born 1994), American football player
Jonah Nickerson (born 1985), American baseball player
Matt Nickerson (born 1985), American ice hockey player
Parry Nickerson (born 1994), American football player
Troy Nickerson, American wrestler
Victor J. Nickerson (1928–2004), American Thoroughbred horse racing trainer

Writing
Billeh Nickerson (born 1972), Canadian writer, editor, and producer
Raymond S. Nickerson, American psychologist and author
Sheila Nickerson (born 1942), American poet and writer
Sylvia Nickerson, Canadian comic book writer

Other
Camille Nickerson (1888–1982), American pianist, composer, and college professor
Deborah Nickerson (1954–2021), American human genomics researcher
Denise Nickerson (1957–2019), American actress who portrayed Violet Beauregarde in Willy Wonka & the Chocolate Factory
Dorothy Nickerson (1900–1985), American color scientist and technologist
Edward I. Nickerson (1845–1908), American architect
Freeman Nickerson (1779–1847), early missionary in Church of Jesus Christ of Latter Day Saints and a member of Zion's Camp
Jackson Nickerson (born 1962), American academic
Joseph Nickerson (1914–1990), English farmer and entrepreneur 
Linus M. Nickerson (1823–1888), American minister, Army chaplain, and Indian agent
Moses H. Nickerson (1844–1943), Canadian journalist, poet and political figure in Nova Scotia; father of Maurice Nickerson
Thomas Nickerson (1805–1883), cabin boy aboard the whaling ship Essex whose sinking was the inspiration for Herman Melville's Moby Dick

See also
Nickerson (disambiguation)
Nicholson (name)